Hemang Dave is an Indian actor and singer from Gujarat, India. He works in Gujarati film. He has been a part of movies like Bey Yaar, Bas Ek Chance, Romeo & Radhika and Tamburo. His 2018 releases include Aavuj Reshe and Chhutti Jashe Chhakka. His upcoming movies are  BaagadBillaa and Peti Pack.

Early life and education 
Hemang Dave was born on 1 January 1983 at Ahmedabad City. Hemang had an inclination towards music since childhood, started learning the tabla from the age of 6.

Career 
He started acting in 2010 with theatre and the first play was Lady Lalkuwar in 2010. In 2011 done the first Gujarati film Kevi Rite Jaish, Be Yaar in 2014. He made his acting debut on the silver screen with the Jay Bhatt's Gujarati comedy movie Thai Jashe, also starring Manoj Joshi, Malhar Thakar and Monal Gajjar. He is popularly known for his notable work in movies including Order Order Out of Order, Tari Maate Once More, Chhutti Jashe Chhakka and Thai Jashe.

He has been worked in many Hindi and Gujarati language plays like "Kasturba", "Akupaar", "Shukdaan", "Dakhla Tarike", "Achlayatan", "Kahyaghra Kantilal", "Bollywood Masala", "Jagi Ne Jounto", "Koi Pan Ek Phool nu Naam Bolo To", "Mera Pia Ghar Aaya" and "Mukti Bandhan".

Filmography

2014
 Be Yaar

2015
 Bas Ek Chance

2016
 Thai Jashe as Deepak Dua
 Romeo & Radhika

2017
 Tamburo

2018
 Tari Maate Once More as Harry
 Chhutti Jashe Chhakka
 Aavuj Reshe 
 Pagalpanti

2019
 Order Order Out of Order

2022 

 Petipack
 Adko Dadko
 Jaysukh Zadpayo
 Kahani Rubberband Ki
 Ghantadi
 Medal (film)
 Bhagwan Bachave

Theatre 
 Kasturba
 Akupaar
 Shukdaan
 Dakhla Tarike
 Achlayatan
 kahyaghra Kantilal
 Bollywood Masala'
 Jagi Ne Jounto Koi Pan Ek Phool nu Naam Bolo To Mera Pia Ghar Aaya Mukti Bandhan''

References

External links 
 

Living people
1983 births
Male actors from Gujarat
Male actors in Gujarati-language films
Gujarati theatre
People from Ahmedabad